Robert John Reynolds (March 17, 1838 – June 10, 1909) was an American farmer and politician from Petersburg in South Murderkill Hundred, Kent County, Delaware. He was a member of the Democratic Party, who served in the Delaware General Assembly, and as Governor of Delaware.

Early life and family
Reynolds was born in Smyrna, Delaware, son of Robert Wright and Sallie Gilder Marvel Reynolds. He married Louvenia Riggs and had one child, Byron, and later married Hester Thomas, with whom he had no children. They lived at "Golden Ridge", near Petersburg in South Murderkill Hundred, Kent County, Delaware and were members of the Methodist Church.

Professional and political career
Reynolds was elected to the State House in 1868 and served the 1869/70 session. From 1879 until 1883 he was state treasurer, and in 1890 was elected the Governor of Delaware, defeating Harry A. Richardson, the Republican candidate. He served from January 20, 1891, until January 15, 1895.

During these years free textbooks were first provided to public school students, and Delaware State College was established in Dover.

Death and legacy
Reynolds died at his home near Petersburg at South Murderkill Hundred, Kent County, Delaware, and is buried at the Loudon Park Cemetery, in Baltimore, Maryland.

Almanac
Elections are held the first Tuesday after November 1. Members of the Delaware General Assembly took office the first Tuesday of January. State representatives have a two-year term. The governor takes office the third Tuesday of January and has a four-year term.

References

Images
Hall of Governors Portrait Gallery Portrait courtesy of Historical and Cultural Affairs, Dover.

External links
Biographical Directory of the Governors of the United States

Delaware’s Governors
The Political Graveyard

Places with more information
Delaware Historical Society; website; 505 North Market Street, Wilmington, Delaware 19801; (302) 655-7161
University of Delaware; Library website; 181 South College Avenue, Newark, Delaware 19717; (302) 831-2965

1838 births
1909 deaths
Methodists from Delaware
Burials at Loudon Park Cemetery
People from Kent County, Delaware
Farmers from Delaware
Democratic Party members of the Delaware House of Representatives
Democratic Party governors of Delaware
Burials in Maryland
People from Smyrna, Delaware